Moneilema opuntiae is a species of beetle in the family Cerambycidae. It was described by Fisher in 1928.

References

Moneilemini
Beetles described in 1928